Klaus Stöber (born 11 September 1961) is a German politician for the AfD and, since 2021, a member of the Bundestag.

Life and politics 

Stöber was born in 1961 in the East German town of Eisenach and was directly elected to the Bundestag in 2021.

References 

Living people
People from Eisenach
1961 births
Alternative for Germany politicians
21st-century German politicians
Members of the Bundestag 2021–2025